A mukhtar is a village chief in the Levant: "an old institution that goes back to the time of the Ottoman rule". According to Amir S. Cheshin, Bill Hutman and Avi Melamed, the mukhtar "for centuries were the central figures". They "were not restricted to Muslim communities" where even non-Arab "Christian and Jewish communities in the Arab world also had mukhtars."

Quoting Tore Björgo: "The mukhtar was, among other things, responsible for collecting taxes and ensuring that law and order was prevailing in his village".

See also
 Kodjabashi

References

External links 
 

Arabic words and phrases
Ottoman Empire